= 1994 Civic Democratic Party leadership election =

Czech party leadership election

- 18 November 1994
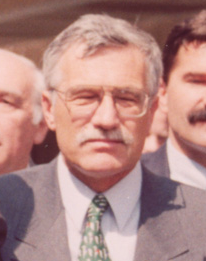
Candidate	Václav Klaus
Electoral vote	266
Percentage	96.73%
Leader of ODS before election
Václav Klaus
Elected Leader of ODS
Václav Klaus

A leadership election for the Civic Democratic Party (ODS) was held in the Czech Republic on 18 November 1994 in Karlovy Vary. Václav Klaus was elected for another 1-year term. He received 266 votes of 275.
